The Chronicle of Georgia (or History Memorial of Georgia) is a monument located near the Tbilisi sea. It was created by Zurab Tsereteli in 1985 but was never fully finished. The monument sits at the top of a large set of stairs. There are 16 pillars that are between 30–35 meters tall and the top half features kings, queens and heroes while the bottom part depict stories from the life of Christ. There is a grapevine cross of St. Nino and a chapel.

Background

Location

History
The Chronicle of Georgia records the history of Georgia in detail. “During the first five thousand years of human occupancy, the population of Georgia was scanty and thinly spread”  Homo erectus has been living in Georgia and developing slowly since the Paleolithic Era. Also, The earliest evidence of wine has been found in Georgia. “This was the introduction of domesticated plants and agriculture. The advent of plants cultivation is the most important event in the development of any culture-so important this point in European pre-history has been called the ‘Agricultural Revolution’. ”(Sears 5) In the above part, the brewing and pottery technology of the Georgian people is described. “After the beginning of the Christian era, a minor revolution took place in the culture of the sedentary shell-fish eating people. They begin to make pottery!”(Sears 4) Therefore, Georgian pottery-making technology is also demonstrated at the top of the Chronicle of Georgia. Georgia was annexed by Russia in 1783. It was incorporated into the Soviet Union in 1936 and renamed the Georgian Soviet Socialist Republic Georgia SSR). During the Soviet period, Zurab Tsereteli built this monument with Soviet funds. In the early 1990s, due to the collapse of the Soviet Union and the Russo Georgian war, there was a lack of funds, and the monument was never fully completed. Until now, intermittently, work continues on the monument.

Religion
The Chronicle of Georgia consists of a large part, which is related to religion. Saint Nino, the enlightener of Georgia, was a woman who preached Christianity in Georgia. The grapevine cross is her symbol. The church next to the Chronicle of Georgia is the church commemorating her. She exists in many Churches in Georgia such as the Georgian Orthodox Church. Georgia began to believe in Christianity in 337 AD. This year King Mirian III declared Christianity the state religion. The spread of Christianity made the ancient Georgian characters disappear and replaced them with new characters mixed with Greek orthography and Syriac alphabet. However, the spread of Christianity boosts the growth of literature and arts.

Tourism
There are large sets of steps on the way to the monument. Here people can overlook the whole of Tbilisi. It's a good choice for tourists to visit here, but few people come to visit the Chronicle of Georgia due to Tbilisi being a diverse city with a palette of attractions. Tbilisi sea is very close to the chronicle of Georgia. Although its name is “Tbilisi sea”, it is an artificial lake and was built in 1953. The length of Tbilisi is 8.75 km and the width is about 2.85 km, the deepest point is 45 m. The surface elevation is situated 650-800 meters above sea level. This place is very popular with the citizens.

Sculptor

life
Zurab Konstantinovich Tsereteli is the Georgian-Russian sculptor and architect for large-scale monuments. He was born in Tbilisi on January 4, 1934. He studied at the Tbilisi State Academy of Arts. After graduation, he stayed at the Georgian Academy of Sciences and studied Georgian folk art. Then Tsereteli becomes the senior master at the industrial combine of the USSR's Arts Foundation in Tbilisi. He had designed many monuments over the world. During the same period when he built the chronicle of Georgia, he also built the Friendship Forever in Moscow's tishinskaya square. It shows the friendship between Russia and Georgia. His career is highly controversial since It has been said that he has been involved in Russia Government. Until March 2014, the artist's aide stated Georgian news and stated that he "generally does not get involved in politics".

References

External links
 TripAdvisor information

1985 establishments in Georgia (country)
Cultural infrastructure completed in 1985
Monuments and memorials in Tbilisi
History of Georgia (country)
Sculptures by Zurab Tsereteli